Malvinder Mohan Singh is a businessman who is now under arrest for criminal breach of trust. He, along with his brother Shivinder Mohan Singh (also under arrest), has many cases of fraud registered against him.

Singh is the former chairman and CEO of Ranbaxy Laboratories, an Indian pharmaceutical company that was sold to Japanese drugmaker Daiichi Sankyo. Singh resigned in 2009 after Ranbaxy posted losses and after Daiichi Sankyo decided to get more actively involved in the newly acquired Indian unit.

In the early hours of 11 October 2019, Malvinder was arrested near Ludhiana, India, on account of a Rs. 740 crore fraud case against him and his brother Shivinder.

Early life
Malvinder Mohan Singh is one of the sons of Dr. Parvinder Singh and the grandson of Bhai Mohan Singh, who bought Ranbaxy Laboratories from the original founders in 1952. He and his brother Shivinder Singh inherited their father's 33.5% stake in Ranbaxy upon his death in 1999. The two used to be among the twenty richest people in India.

Singh attended The Doon School, Dehradun, and graduated with a degree in economics from St. Stephen's College, Delhi. He also received a masters of business administration (MBA) from Duke University's Fuqua School of Business.

Business career
Malvinder Singh's tenure as CEO of Ranbaxy is controversial. A corporate culture of fraud prevailed under his leadership. In November 2006, Singh led a delegation to FDA headquarters to try to reverse the decision not to accept new drug applications from Ranbaxy. This attempt failed as the FDA asked Ranbaxy to turn over audits done by its outside consultant, Parexel, which the company was claiming were confidential. The meeting ended in a standoff. On 11 June 2008, Singh stunned the Indian business world by announcing that he and his brother were selling their 33.5% stake in Ranbaxy to the Japanese drugmaker Daiichi Sankyo for $2 billion.

Malvinder Singh is the founder of Religare Wellness (now Fortis Healthcare).

Arrest

On 10 October 2019, Malvinder and Shivinder Singh were arrested by the Delhi police Economic Offences Wing (EOW). The arrests took place within hours of each other.  The brothers were charged with criminal breach of trust, conspiracy, and cheating.  Delhi police said that they were arrested under section 409 (criminal breach of trust by a public servant, banker, merchant or agent) and section 420 (cheating) of the Indian Penal Code.  Both brothers have denied the charges

Their former company, Religare Finvest, reported the Singhs' crimes to the EOW, alleging embezzlement.

As of 9 February 2021, both Singh brothers remain under arrest as their judicial custody has been extended until the next hearing.

References

The Doon School alumni
Indian businesspeople in the pharmaceutical industry
Fuqua School of Business alumni
Indian Sikhs
Living people
Year of birth missing (living people)